This is a list of all lighthouses in the U.S. state of Minnesota as identified by the United States Coast Guard. There are five active lights in the state; one light is inactive but has been converted to a museum, and one is in ruins.

The first lighthouse in the state was erected in 1858 and the last in 1922 (ignoring automated towers erected later); the oldest active light is the Two Harbors Light.

If not otherwise noted, focal height and coordinates are taken from the United States Coast Guard Light List, while location and dates of activation, automation, and deactivation are taken from the United States Coast Guard Historical information site for lighthouses.

References

Minnesota
Lighthouses
Lighthouses